Andrew William Carter (born 29 January 1949) is a male British retired track and field athlete.

Athletics career
Carter participated in the men's 800 metres at the 1972 Summer Olympics in Munich, West Germany. Carter finished sixth in a time of 1:46.55.

Carter won the bronze medal at the 1971 European Championships in Helsinki, Finland in the men's 800 metres, behind Yevgeniy Arzhanov (Soviet Union) and Dieter Fromm (East Germany) in a time of 1:46.16. He won the AAA title in 1970, 1972 and 1973. Carter won the European Cup in 1973 in Edinburgh defeating the Olympic silver medalist Arzhanov in 1:46.44. In 1974 he won a silver medal representing England in the 4×400 metre relay event, at the 1974 British Commonwealth Games in Christchurch, New Zealand. He finished fifth in the 800 metres in a time of 1:45.97.

Carter recorded his fastest time of 1:45.12 in 1973, winning the AAA Championship at London’s Crystal Palace. He improved the British record for 800 metres on three occasions. His other personal bests included: 400 metres – 48.0; 1,000 metres – 2:18.5 (1974); 1 mile – 3:59.3 (1972).

The U.S. magazine Track & Field News annual world rankings ranked Carter third at 800 metres in 1971. They ranked him eighth in 1972 and sixth in 1973.

References

 Quercetani, Roberto and Kok, Nejat (1992): Wizards of the Middle Distances: A History of the 800 metres
 Phillips, Bob (2000): A History of Athletics at the Commonwealth Games
 Watman, Mel (1981): Encyclopedia of Track and Field Athletics
 Track & Field News rankings
 Personal Bests
 British All-Time Lists: 800 metres
 

British male middle-distance runners
Athletes (track and field) at the 1972 Summer Olympics
Olympic athletes of Great Britain
1949 births
Living people
Sportspeople from Exeter
European Athletics Championships medalists
Athletes (track and field) at the 1974 British Commonwealth Games
Commonwealth Games medallists in athletics
Commonwealth Games silver medallists for England
Medallists at the 1974 British Commonwealth Games